"Talk Tonight" is a song by English rock band Oasis, written and sung by the band's lead guitarist Noel Gallagher. It was originally released on 24 April 1995 as the B-side of their UK number one single "Some Might Say" along with "Acquiesce" and "Headshrinker" and appears on the B-side compilation album, The Masterplan, released in November 1998. In the United States, it was released as one of the B-sides to "Wonderwall". This song also appears in remastered form on the 2014 deluxe version of (What's the Story) Morning Glory?.

Background and inspiration
"Talk Tonight" is one of many acoustic B-side tracks sung by Noel. It was inspired by the near-breakup of the band in Los Angeles in autumn 1994, when Noel walked out without telling anyone and headed for San Francisco. He stayed with a girl he had befriended during a previous show there. According to the sleeve notes to The Masterplan, she talked a distraught Noel "off the ledge" and took him to the park where she had played as a child. It is also mentioned in the Oasis book by Paul Mathurs, Take Me There, that the girl also had an obsession with Snapple strawberry lemonade, which contributed to the line in the song, "all your dreams are made of strawberry lemonade."

In an interview with the San Francisco Chronicle in November 2016, Melissa Lim states she met Noel backstage at Bottom of the Hill in 1994, recalling: "He came over and sat down next to me, I had never been backstage before, so I asked him, 'Where's the afterparty?' And he goes, 'What afterparty? Can I hang out with you tonight?'". Three days later, after a disastrous performance at Whisky a Go Go in Los Angeles, and after a dispute with Liam, Noel went to Lim's apartment in Nob Hill. "He was very upset," said Lim. "I took him in, fed him and tried to calm him down. He wanted to break up the band. We went to Huntington Park to clear his mind. We listened to music. We went record shopping". After bringing back magazines and Snapple Strawberry Lemonade, Lim then convinced Noel to return to Oasis, "San Francisco has a reputation of being a place where bands come to die, like The Band and the Sex Pistols," says Lim. "I wasn't going to let it happen on my watch. I told him, 'You can't leave the band — you're on the verge of something big.'"

In the film Supersonic, Noel claims not to remember Lim's name. Lim stated "Keith Richards can remember the name of his milkman from when he was 8 years old. I don't know what's going on with Noel, and that's fine. I was a part of something that touched so many people. That's good enough."

Other use
The song is also featured on the DVD Live by the Sea after Noel makes a mistake on the track "D'Yer Wanna Be A Spaceman?" and abandons the song.
The song is also included on Oasis' compilation album Stop the Clocks.
Paul Weller played keyboards when Oasis performed this song on Channel 4's The White Room in 1995.

In media
An extract of the song was used in the 2008 GCSE Music Listening Paper Exam.
The song was featured in an episode of popular British soap EastEnders at Jase Dyer's funeral.
The song was performed at Oasis' MTV Unplugged concert in August 1996.

Personnel
 Noel Gallagher – lead and backing vocals, acoustic guitar, handclaps
 Paul Arthurs – acoustic guitar, electric piano, handclaps

Certifications

References

1995 songs
Oasis (band) songs
Songs written by Noel Gallagher
Song recordings produced by Noel Gallagher